Kuznetsovka is a rural locality (a village) in Kaltovsky Selsoviet, Iglinsky District, Bashkortostan, Russia. The population was 58 as of 2010. There are 4 streets.

Geography 
Kuznetsovka is located 36 km southeast of Iglino (the district's administrative centre) by road. Mamayevka is the nearest rural locality.

References 

Rural localities in Iglinsky District